This is a list of television programs currently and formerly broadcast by truTV, a cable and satellite television network owned by the Warner Bros. Discovery Networks division of Warner Bros. Discovery. This list also covers programs that aired during the network's years as Court TV from its original launch in 1991 until its 2008 re-branding as truTV.

Current programming

Original programming
A list of shows currently in production, as of December 25, 2021.

Sports

Acquired
Any acquired programming from truTV's sister networks will be noted beside title.

Upcoming programming

Original programming
Game Changers (TBA)
Seoul Hunters (TBA)
This Functional Family (TBA)

Acquired programming
 Entourage (2023)

Former programming
Some of the shows on this list (indicated in bold) are currently airing in reruns on truTV.

Original programming

Acquired programming

Sports

References

truTV